Hardie Davis (born December 5, 1968) is an American politician who has served as the Mayor of consolidated Augusta-Richmond County, Georgia from January 1, 2015 to December 31, 2022. He was the second African American elected mayor of Augusta since the city and county governments consolidated in 1996. He previously served in the Georgia House of Representatives from the 122nd district from 2007 to 2009 and in the Georgia State Senate from the 22nd district from 2010 to 2014.

References

1968 births
Living people
Mayors of Augusta, Georgia
Democratic Party members of the Georgia House of Representatives
Democratic Party Georgia (U.S. state) state senators
African-American mayors in Georgia (U.S. state)